Timothy Blake Nelson (born May 11, 1964) is an American actor and playwright.

Described as a "modern character actor", his roles include Delmar O'Donnell in O Brother, Where Art Thou? (2000), Gideon in Minority Report (2002), Dr. Pendanski in Holes (2003), Danny Dalton Jr. in Syriana (2005), Samuel Sterns in the Marvel Cinematic Universe, Richard Schell in Lincoln (2012), the title character in The Ballad of Buster Scruggs (2018), and Henry McCarty in Old Henry (2021). He portrayed Wade Tillman / Looking Glass in the HBO limited series Watchmen (2019), for which he received a Critics' Choice Television Awards nomination for Best Supporting Actor in a Drama Series in 2020.

Nelson's directorial credits include Eye of God (1997), which was nominated for the Sundance Grand Jury Prize and an Independent Spirit Award; O (2001), a modern-day adaptation of Othello; and the Holocaust drama The Grey Zone (2001). Eye of God and The Grey Zone were both adapted from Nelson's own plays.

Early life
Nelson was born to a Jewish family in Tulsa, Oklahoma, the son of Ruth Nelson (née Kaiser), a noted Tulsa social activist and philanthropist, and Don Nelson, a geologist and wildcatter. His maternal uncle is businessman George Kaiser.

His maternal grandparents Herman Geo. Kaiser and Kate Kaiser, daughter of businessman Max Samuel, were from Germany, and escaped the Nazis shortly before World War II. They moved to Britain in 1938, where Nelson's mother was born, and immigrated to the United States in 1941. His father's family were Russian-Jewish emigrants.

Nelson attended the Oklahoma Summer Arts Institute at Quartz Mountain Resort Arts and Conference Center in Lone Wolf, Oklahoma.

Nelson is a 1982 graduate of Holland Hall School in Tulsa, and a graduate of Brown University, where he was a classics major as well as senior orator for his class of 1986. At Brown, he studied under philosopher Martha Nussbaum. He is a member of the Phi Beta Kappa Society. He won the Workman/Driskoll award for excellence in classical studies. He graduated from Juilliard in 1990, a member of Group 19.

Career

Nelson's debut play, Eye of God, was produced at Seattle Repertory Theatre in 1992. The Grey Zone premiered at MCC Theater in New York in 1996, where his 1998 work Anadarko was produced. He was a co-star of the sketch comedy show The Unnaturals, which ran on HA! (later CTV, and would turn into Comedy Central) between 1989 and 1991, alongside Paul Zaloom, John Mariano and Siobhan Fallon Hogan.

Nelson has appeared as an actor in film, TV and theatre. He had a featured role as Delmar in the film O Brother, Where Art Thou? According to directors Joel and Ethan Coen, he was the only one in the cast or crew who had read Homer's Odyssey, a story upon which the film is loosely based. He sang "In the Jailhouse Now" on the film's soundtrack (which received a Grammy for Album of the Year in 2002). He has had a number of supporting performances in feature films such as Minority Report, Syriana and Lincoln. He also appeared in Marvel Comics adaptations The Incredible Hulk and Fantastic Four. He portrayed Ralph Myers in the drama/legal drama Just Mercy (2019).

Nelson narrated the 2001 audiobook At the Altar of Speed: The Fast Life and Tragic Death of Dale Earnhardt, Sr. He appeared on stage extensively off-Broadway in New York at theatres including Manhattan Theater Club, Playwrights Horizons, Manhattan Class Company, Soho Repertory Theater, New York Theatre Workshop, and Central Park's Open Air Theater in the Shakespeare plays Richard III, Troilus and Cressida, and A Midsummer Night's Dream.

He has directed film versions of his plays The Grey Zone and Eye of God (for which he received an Independent Spirit Awards nomination for the Someone to Watch Award), and directed two of his original screenplays: Kansas (1998) and Leaves of Grass (2009). He directed the film O, based on Othello and set in a modern-day high school.

For Eye of God, he received the Tokyo Bronze Prize at the Tokyo International Film Festival (1997) and the American Independent Award at the Seattle International Film Festival (1997); for O, the Best Director Award at the Seattle International Film Festival (2001); and for The Grey Zone, the National Board of Review's Freedom of Expression Award (2002). He is on the boards of directors of The Actors Center in New York City and the Soho Rep Theatre.

Nelson guest-starred on the CSI: Crime Scene Investigation season 10 episode "Working Stiffs". In the episode "My Brother's Bomber" (aired September 29, 2015) of the PBS investigative series Frontline, he talked about the loss of his friend David Dornstein in the 1988 bombing of Pan Am Flight 103 over Lockerbie, Scotland.

In 2018, Nelson played the title character in The Ballad of Buster Scruggs, a western anthology film by Joel and Ethan Coen, after receiving the original script 16 years prior, in 2002. The film was released on Netflix on November 16, after a limited theatrical run, and received positive reviews, with many highlighting Nelson's performance and his overall segment. In January 2023, he joined the cast of Dune: Part Two.

Playwright
Nelson's play Socrates opened at The Public Theater in 2019, starring Michael Stuhlbarg. It was favorably received by numerous publications, including the New York Times.

Personal life
Nelson resides in New York City with his wife, Lisa Benavides, and their three sons. On May 8, 2009, he was inducted as an honorary member of the University of Tulsa's Beta of Oklahoma chapter of the Phi Beta Kappa national collegiate honor society.

Filmography

Film

Television

Video games

References

External links

 
 

1964 births
Living people
20th-century American dramatists and playwrights
20th-century American male actors
20th-century American male writers
21st-century American dramatists and playwrights
21st-century American male actors
21st-century American male writers
American male dramatists and playwrights
American male film actors
American male screenwriters
American male Shakespearean actors
American male stage actors
American male television actors
American male voice actors
American people of German-Jewish descent
American people of Russian-Jewish descent
Brown University alumni
Film directors from New York City
Grammy Award winners
Jewish American dramatists and playwrights
Jewish American male actors
Juilliard School alumni
Male actors from Tulsa, Oklahoma
Screenwriters from New York (state)
Writers from Tulsa, Oklahoma